The Maw language may refer to:

Mal Paharia language, from India
Ndam language, also known as Maw of Kouam, from Chad
Tai Mao language, also known as Tai Maw, from Burma
Parauk Wa language, also known as, Mong Maw, Khwin Maw, from Burma